The Men's individual compound was one of the events held in archery at the 2008 Summer Paralympics in Beijing. There were two classes: a class for W1 wheelchair competitors and an open class. In the ranking round each archer shot 72 arrows; in the knockout stages the tally was reduced to 12 arrows each.

W1

The W1 class was won by David Drahoninsky, representing .

Ranking Round

Competition bracket

Open

The Open class was won by John Stubbs, representing .

Ranking Round

Competition bracket

References

M